Jung Dong-ho (born January 11, 1975) is a Paralympian athlete from South Korea competing mainly in category T53 Sprint events.

Jung competed in the 2008 Summer Paralympics in Beijing in the individual 100m and 400m as well as part of the South Korean teams in the 4 × 100 m and 4 × 400 m. He won a bronze medal in the 4 × 100 m with his Korean teammates.

External links
 profile on paralympic.org

Paralympic athletes of South Korea
Athletes (track and field) at the 2008 Summer Paralympics
Paralympic bronze medalists for South Korea
Living people
1975 births
Medalists at the 2008 Summer Paralympics
Paralympic medalists in athletics (track and field)